The one-spot puller (in New Zealand) or brown puller (in Australia), Chromis hypsilepis, is a damselfish of the genus Chromis, found off south-east Australia and between North Cape and East Cape of the North Island of New Zealand to depths of about 60 metres, off rocky coasts.  It grows to a length between 15 and 20 centimetres.

References

 
 
 Tony Ayling & Geoffrey Cox, Collins Guide to the Sea Fishes of New Zealand,  (William Collins Publishers Ltd, Auckland, New Zealand 1982) 

Chromis
Fish described in 1867
Taxa named by Albert Günther